Ahlen (Westfalen) station—abbreviated to Ahlen (Westf)—serves the town of Ahlen in the German state of North Rhine-Westphalia. It is situated on the electrified, four-track Hamm–Minden railway, which connects the Ruhr region to Hanover. It was originally part of the network of the former Cologne-Minden Railway Company and is now part of the Deutsche Bahn network.

History

The station was opened on 15 Ahlen October 1847 during the construction of the trunk line of the Cologne-Minden Railway Company. The first station building, built in 1848, was demolished during the First World War, because at this point the line, which had previously run at ground level, was placed on an embankment. The new station building, which is still in use, opened in 1916.

Current significance

The station is a classed as a category 4 station. It is connected by services every half-hour to Bielefeld, Hamm (Westf) and Gütersloh, which each provide further connections under North Rhine-Westphalia’s integrated timetable.

The station has a travel centre, which since 2007 has been operated by a private travel agency. There is also a bookstore with a kiosk operation and a bakery. For the purchase of tickets outside of business hours ticket machines are available at the travel centre for long-distance and local services.

The stairways to the platforms are equipped on one side with stairlifts for wheelchair access.

Links from the station 

Next to the station is the town’s central bus station. From here city bus lines run to the urban area of Ahlen. Regional bus services run to neighbouring cities. The city buses are operated by Regionalverkehr Münsterland (Regional transport of Münsterland) and the city of Ahlen.

Park and Ride
Behind the station building is a parking area with parking spaces for park-and-ride and “park-and-rail” (for longer journeys than commuting). At the central bus station there are bicycle stands.

Notes

References

 
  

Railway stations in North Rhine-Westphalia
Railway stations in Germany opened in 1847
1847 establishments in Prussia
Buildings and structures in Warendorf (district)